Cheshmeh Golek-e Sofla (also Romanized as Cheshmeh Golek-e Soflá; also known as Cheshmeh Golek-e Pā’īn) is a village in Balaband Rural District, in the Central District of Fariman County, Razavi Khorasan Province, Iran. At the 2006 census, its population was 201, in 42 families.

References 

Populated places in Fariman County